The Caribbean Broadcasting Union (CBU) founded in 1970 is a non-profit association of public service and commercial broadcasters in the Caribbean. Its secretariat is based in Barbados.

Beginning in the mid-1980s, the CBU created several regionally syndicated programmes including CaribScope, Caribbean Newsline, Caribbean News Review, Caribbean Business Weekly, Talk Caribbean, the Caribbean Song Festival, Riddim Express and the CaribVision television news exchange, among other programmes. These were some of the first television programmes to contribute to a nascent regional integration movement and enjoyed wide viewership, particularly CaribScope, a magazine containing arts, cultural and general-interest features submitted by member stations.

Leadership of the association is mainly rotated between representatives of the affiliated media houses. On 9 June 2000 the commercial operations of the CBU and the Caribbean News Agency were merged into the Caribbean Media Corporation, also based in Barbados, which has carried on the business of television production begun by the CBU.

The CBU's current mandate includes the facilitation of some broadcast services, representation, and training of the staff of member stations in support of a unified Caribbean community. It holds an Annual General Assembly (AGA) in one of the member nations every August. Member stations are drawn from the 15 member nations of the Caribbean Community, with the exception of Haiti. Other member stations are drawn from several nations in the Caribbean area.

Members

Full members

Associate members

Non-member affiliates & associates 
 North American National Broadcasters Association (NANBA)
 National Association of Broadcasters (NAB)
 World Broadcasting Unions (WBU)
 Commonwealth Broadcasting Association (CBA)
 Caribbean News Agency (CANA)
 European Broadcasting Union (EBU)
 Arab States Broadcasting Union (ASBU)
 Asia-Pacific Broadcasting Union (ABU)
 Union des Radiodiffusion et télévisions Nationales d'Afrique (URTNA)
 Organización de Televisión Iberoamericana (OTI)
 Asociación Internacional de Radiodifusión (AIR)
 Canadian Association of Broadcasters (CBA)

Previous presidents of the CBU

1999–2002: Stewart Krohn
1991–1999: Vic Fernandes
1987–1991: J.A. Lester Spaulding
1984–1987: Frits Pengel
1980–1984: Terrence Holder
1976–1980: Frits Pengel
1975–1976: Ron Sanders
1973–1975: Leo de Leon
1970–1973: Ray Smith

See also 
 Caribbean Media Corporation (CMC)
 Latin American Union of News Agencies

References

External links
 The CBU - The Caribbean Broadcasting Union online

Caribbean Media Corporation
Business-related television channels
Organizations established in 1970
1970 establishments in Barbados